"Pearl in the Shell" is the fourth and final single released by musician Howard Jones from the album Human's Lib. Released in May 1984, the song reached number seven on the UK Singles Chart. It features a saxophone solo by Davey Payne of Ian Dury's band The Blockheads.

Unlike Jones' previous singles, the 12" single edition did not feature an extended mix of the main track, though an extended mix later appeared on The 12" Album.  Instead, the track "Total Conditioning" was an extended version of the song "Conditioning" also taken from Human's Lib, featuring additional lyrics lifted from most of the other songs on that album.

Track listing
7"
"Pearl in the Shell" (Jones) – 4:02
"Law of the Jungle" (Jones) – 3:19

Two Limited Edition singles were released featuring the same tracks as above.  One was the standard 7" in a poster bag sleeve, the other was a shaped picture disc.

12"
"Pearl in the Shell" (Jones) – 4:02
"Law of the Jungle" (Jones) – 3:19
"Total Conditioning" (Jones/Bryant) – 8:04

References

External links
The Official Howard Jones Website Discography

1984 singles
Howard Jones (English musician) songs
Songs written by Howard Jones (English musician)
1984 songs
Warner Music Group singles
Song recordings produced by Rupert Hine